Thomas LeRoy Armstrong (31 December 1936 – 27 April 2022) was a Canadian businessman and politician.  He was the member of the Legislative Assembly of New Brunswick for the riding of Kings East.

Armstrong was born in Searsville, New Brunswick. In his youth he worked in the forestry, rail and grocery businesses before moving to Apohaqui, New Brunswick in 1965 and founding a trucking operation, which he merged into a larger operation in 1985 called Kingsco.  Kingsco is still an active business of which Armstrong was a part.

A Liberal, he was first elected to the legislature in the 1995 election but was defeated in the 1999 election which saw the Liberals lose 35 seats to the Progressive Conservatives.

Armstrong was re-elected in 2003 and served for the duration of the 55th New Brunswick Legislative Assembly as opposition critic for agriculture.  He was defeated in his bid for re-election in the 2006 election.

Armstrong also served as chairman of The Concerned Citizens Group.  He died on 27 April 2022, at the Saint John Regional Hospital at the age of 85.

References

External links
 MLA Bios, Government of New Brunswick (pdf)

1936 births
2022 deaths
New Brunswick Liberal Association MLAs
21st-century Canadian politicians
People's Alliance of New Brunswick politicians